Sabeh (also Romanized as Sab‘eh; also known as Sab‘eh-ye Yek) is a village in Gharb-e Karun Rural District, in the Central District of Khorramshahr County, Khuzestan Province, Iran. At the 2006 census, its population was 871, in 151 families.

References 

Populated places in Khorramshahr County